Serge Renko  is a French actor. He appeared in more than thirty films since 1982.

Selected filmography

References

External links 

Date of birth missing (living people)
Living people
French male film actors
20th-century French male actors
21st-century French male actors
Year of birth missing (living people)